Emma Morrison is a Ghanaian television personality and media professional.

She started her media career, working with TV3 Network Limited when the station was established in 1997 as a news reporter and a newscaster.

Early life 
She was born on 5 June and is the third child of her mum and the seventh of her dad. Her dad has 13 children, 11 girls and two boys.

Her dad is the late Jacob Herbert Morrison and her mother is Victoria Morrison.

Education 
Morrison started her education in the United Kingdom, where she attended Dollis Junior High School and Childshill School both in North West London.

She continued at Goldfields Preparatory School when she relocated to Ghana. She attended Wesley Girls' High School and Tarkwa Secondary School.

She is a product of the Ghana Institute of Journalism.

Career 
She started her media work with TV3 in 1997 as a reporter/newscaster, rising through the ranks to become the general manager for news and sports at TV3.

She later assumed a role as the editor of Joy News TV.

She is currently the group head of business programming, radio, TV, IM at Multimedia Group Ltd and doubles as consultant, executive producer for News Generation. Emma Morrison joins Gold Fields Ghana as corporate affairs head.

Awards 
She has won some awards like the Newscaster of the Year, TV Personality of the Year, and her news programme News 360 won TV News Programme of the Year. In April 2019 she was proclaimed the Corporate Personality of the Year at the Glitz Ghana Women of the Year Honors.

References 



Living people
Ghanaian television journalists
Year of birth missing (living people)
Ghanaian women journalists
21st-century Ghanaian women
Ghana Institute of Journalism alumni
People educated at Wesley Girls' Senior High School